Sebastian Schulte (born 13 December 1978 in Wiesbaden) is a German former representative rower. He was a 2006 world champion in the German men's eight and an Olympian. He consistently represented in the German men's eight - the Deutschlandachter- at World Rowing Championships and Olympic Games between 2001 and 2007. 

He rowed in the 2005, 2006 and 2007 University Boat Races for Cambridge University securing one victory in the 2007 Cambridge eight.

See also
 List of Cambridge University Boat Race crews
 Rowing at the Summer Olympics

References 

 
 

1978 births
Living people
Sportspeople from Wiesbaden
Olympic rowers of Germany
Rowers at the 2004 Summer Olympics
Cambridge University Boat Club rowers
World Rowing Championships medalists for Germany
German male rowers
Alumni of Gonville and Caius College, Cambridge